Nadjib Mohammedi (born 12 March 1985) is a French professional boxer and light heavyweight world title challenger.

Career
Mohammedi turned professional in 2005 and became the France light heavyweight champion in 2008. However, he lost the title a year later in 2009 in an early TKO defeat by Thierry Karl in the first round. Mohammedi would bounce back from his defeat against Karl and become light heavyweight champion of France again in 2013 after defeating Patrick Bois via unanimous decision.

Mohammedi garnered a lot of attention to himself in 2014 after defeating Anatoliy Dudchenko in a 7th round TKO victory which moved him into position to challenge Bernard Hopkins for the IBF light heavyweight title. Mohammedi went on to face Demetrius Walker on the undercard of the Kovalev vs. Hopkins bout and won via KO victory in the 1st round. He announced a deal with boxing promotion company Main Events less than a week after his defeat of Walker. He is currently trained by Abel Sanchez.

Professional boxing record

References

Living people
1985 births
Light-heavyweight boxers
French sportspeople of Algerian descent
French male boxers